Roy Herbert Reinhart (born September 11, 1919, died December 11, 2005 Oxford, Ohio) was a zoologist, geologist, and paleontologist.  He is especially remembered for his research on Sirenia and the discovery of the order Desmostylia.

Life
Reinhart earned his B.S. at Miami University, Oxford, Ohio, in 1941.  He met is wife, Betty J. (née Whitesell) while an undergraduate student at Miami.

During WW2, Reinhart served as lieutenant Combat Engineer in Patton's Third army and took part in the Liberation of Paris, the Battle of the Bulge, the Crossing of the Rhine, and the liberation of Buchenwald.

After the war, he founded the Department of Geology at West Texas State College before returning to Miami as a teacher in paleontology.  He discovered and described the order Desmostylia, a group of marine mammals, in 1959.

He was rewarded twice as an author; the AK Morris Award in 1991 and the John Dolibois Award in 1994.  In 1991, he donated  of land to Miami University, now known as the Reinhart Reserve.

Throughout his life, Reinhart was an active cross country runner and a published cartoonist.  Except his interest in fossils of all kind, he also assembled one of the finest collections of mound builder relics in the US.

Reinhart had a brother, a sister, two daughters, one son, three grandchildren, and five great-grandchildren.  He and his wife were named Parents of the Year in 1972.  He died in December 2005 after a brief illness.

Bibliography
 
 
 
 
  (thesis)

References

External links
 

20th-century American geologists
American paleontologists
Paleozoologists
1919 births
2005 deaths
20th-century American zoologists